Ceuthophilus secretus, known generally as the Texas cave cricket or secret cave cricket, is a species of camel cricket in the family Rhaphidophoridae. It is found in North America.

References

secretus
Articles created by Qbugbot
Insects described in 1894